Ostrowite may refer to the following places in Poland:
Ostrowite, Golub-Dobrzyń County in Kuyavian-Pomeranian Voivodeship (north-central Poland)
Ostrowite, Lipno County in Kuyavian-Pomeranian Voivodeship (north-central Poland)
Ostrowite, Świecie County in Kuyavian-Pomeranian Voivodeship (north-central Poland)
Ostrowite, Rypin County in Kuyavian-Pomeranian Voivodeship (north-central Poland)
Ostrowite, Gniezno County in Greater Poland Voivodeship (west-central Poland)
Ostrowite, Słupca County in Greater Poland Voivodeship (west-central Poland)
Ostrowite, Bytów County in Pomeranian Voivodeship (north Poland)
Ostrowite, Lubusz Voivodeship (west Poland)
Ostrowite, Gmina Chojnice in Pomeranian Voivodeship (north Poland)
Ostrowite, Gmina Czersk in Pomeranian Voivodeship (north Poland)
Ostrowite, Gmina Pszczółki in Pomeranian Voivodeship (north Poland)
Ostrowite, Gdańsk County in Pomeranian Voivodeship (north Poland)
Ostrowite, Kartuzy County in Pomeranian Voivodeship (north Poland)
Ostrowite, Gmina Gniew in Pomeranian Voivodeship (north Poland)
Ostrowite, Nowe Miasto County in Warmian-Masurian Voivodeship (north Poland)
Ostrowite, Ostróda County in Warmian-Masurian Voivodeship (north Poland)